Hotel for Dogs (1971) is a children's novel by Lois Duncan. It was adapted into a film of the same name by Nickelodeon Movies for DreamWorks Pictures, released on January 16, 2009. When the book was originally released in 1971, Andi's name was Liz, and Friday's name was Sadie. The book was re-released December 1, 2008, to promote the film with the names changed.

Two sequels were released: News for Dogs in 2009 and Movie for Dogs in 2010.

Plot

Andrea "Andi" Walker is a girl who was forced to temporarily move to her animal-allergic great-aunt Alice's house, leaving her dog Bebe in the care of another family. Shortly after the move, she finds a stranded dog and wishes to keep her. Andi's mother vetoes this idea, so, along with her older brother Bruce, she keeps the dog, who she names Friday, and her pups in an abandoned house across the street.

After a while, Andi and Bruce allow in many more dogs, including Red Rover, an Irish Setter that ran away from his abusive owner, Jerry Gordon, Aunt Alice's neighbor who pretends to be nice. In the end, their expenses overwhelm them, and they are discovered by their father, mother, and aunt. Jerry's wickedness is revealed to his ignorant father, prompting him to sell Red Rover.

All the dogs living in the hotel leave. Red Rover, Friday, and Bebe return home with the Walkers when they move out of Aunt Alice's house, while all the other dogs are adopted.

Characters

Humans
 Andrea "Andi" Walker – The main character, she has a passion for dogs.
 Bruce Walker – Andi's brother, he helps her take in the abandoned dogs.
 Jerry Gordon – Andi and Bruce's enemy, he abuses his dog Red Rover.
 Aunt Alice – Andi and Bruce's aunt, she has a dog allergy. 
 Tim – A boy originally from Jerry Gordon's gang, he comes to help Andi and Bruce with the dog hotel.
 Mr Walker – Andi and Bruce's dad
 Mrs Walker – Andi and Bruce's mum
 Debbie – Andi's friend, she helps her with the hotel
 Tiffany – Andi's friend, she helps her with the hotel. She, as owner of the Bulldales, is the one to get them.

Dog characters
 MacTavish – An abandoned dog that Andi takes to the hotel
 Red Rover – An Irish Setter that belongs to Jerry Gordon and was mistreated by him
 Bebe – Andi's first dog that she has to leave behind
 Friday – A little dog that Andi finds and takes to the hotel, she also has puppies
 Preston – A big, tough hound
 The Bulldales – Five puppies owned by Tiffany

External links

1971 American novels
American children's novels
American novels adapted into films
Novels by Lois Duncan
Children's novels about animals
1971 children's books
Novels about dogs
Houghton Mifflin books